Lot 34 is a township in Queens County, Prince Edward Island, Canada. It is part of Charlotte Parish. Lot 34 was awarded to John Dickson in the 1767 land lottery while Dickson was the Member of Parliament (MP) for Peeblesshire. Sir James Montgomery, 1st Baronet obtained the land upon Dickson's death.

References

34
Geography of Queens County, Prince Edward Island